The 2019 Hastings Deering Colts season was the 2nd season of the under-20 competition, sponsored by Hastings Deering and run by the Queensland Rugby League. The draw and structure of the competition mirrored that of its senior counterpart, the Queensland Cup.

The Sunshine Coast Falcons won their first premiership, defeating the Wynnum Manly Seagulls in the Grand Final.

Teams
The Victoria Thunderbolts moved to the New South Wales-run Jersey Flegg Cup in 2019, leaving the competition with fourteen sides, thirteen based in Queensland and one in northern New South Wales. 13 Queensland Cup teams field a side in the competition, with each team affiliated with an NRL club.

Ladder 
Source:

Final series

Grand Final

Player statistics
The following statistics are correct as of the conclusion of Round 23.

Leading try scorers

Leading point scorers

References

2019 in Australian rugby league